Osei Mawuli  is a Ghanaian footballer.

References

1989 births
Living people
Ghanaian footballers
Liberty Professionals F.C. players
Hapoel Ashkelon F.C. players
Hapoel Ironi Kiryat Shmona F.C. players
Hapoel Haifa F.C. players
Hapoel Bnei Lod F.C. players
Hapoel Nof HaGalil F.C. players
Maccabi Sha'arayim F.C. players
Asante Kotoko S.C. players
Mekelle 70 Enderta F.C. players
Fasil Kenema S.C. players
Liga Leumit players
Israeli Premier League players
Ghana Premier League players
Expatriate footballers in Israel
Expatriate footballers in Ethiopia
Ghanaian expatriate sportspeople in Israel
Ghanaian expatriate sportspeople in Ethiopia
Association football forwards